Crab Apple Jelly is a 1944 short story collection by Frank O'Connor. It includes the following stories:

The Bridal Night
Old Fellows
The Grand Vizier's Daughters
Song Without Words
'The Star That Bids The Shepherd Fold' (alternative title: The Shepherds)
The Long Road to Ummera
The Miser
The House That Johnny Built
The New Teacher (alternate title: The Cheapjack)
The Luceys
Uprooted
The Mad Lomasneys

According to the critic Richard Ellmann, "crab apple jelly" was O'Connor's description of the "sweet and tart mixture" he aimed for in his work generally. Ellmann adds, "[O'Connor's] best stories stir those facial muscles which, we are told, are the same for both laughing and weeping."

References

1944 short story collections
Short story collections by Frank O'Connor
Works by Frank O'Connor